Miss Brazil 2004 was the 50th edition of the Miss Brazil pageant. It was held on 15 April 2004 at Credicard Hall in São Paulo, São Paulo State, Brazil and was hosted by Nayla Micherif and Gustavo Gianetti with Thiago Mansur, Astrid Fontenelle, Fernando Scherer, Sabrina Parlatore, Luciana Curtis, and Isabella Fiorentino all as commentators. Gislaine Ferreira, who is originally from Minas Gerais but competed as Miss Tocantins, crowned her successor Fabiane Niclotti of Rio Grande do Sul at the end of the event. Niclotti represented Brazil at the Miss Universe 2004 pageant. 1st Runner-Up, Iara Coelho of Minas Gerais, represented Brazil at Miss World 2004 and 2nd Runner-Up, Grazi Massafera of Paraná, represented the country at Miss International 2004.

Results

Special Awards

Contestants
The delegates for Miss Brazil 2004 were:

 - Fabíola Gomes dos Santos
 - Fernanda Scorsatto Dorigon
 - Ellen Paula Coutinho Santana
 - Priscilla Meirelles de Almeida
 - Karoline Araújo de Souza
 - Jorlene Rodrigues Cordeiro
 - Alynne da Silva Coutinho
 - Angélica Corona Bassini
 - Jane de Sousa Borges Oliveira
 - Lara Polyane Furtado Cunha
 - Betânia Cristina Zambiazzi
 - Maisa Krüger
 - Iara Maria R. Azevedo Coelho
 - Karla Braga Albuquerque
 - Isabela Marinho da Nóbrega
 - Grazielli Soares Massafera
 - Amanda H. Nolasco Cavalcanti
 - Shênia Laiane Magalhães de Oliveira
 - Anelise Gomes Sobral
 - Suzana Schott da Silveira
 - Fabiane Tesche Niclotti
 - Luana Najara Aben Athar Silva
 - Catarina de Lima Guerra
 - Célia Renata da Silva
 - Mayra Bernava Simões
 - Juliana Melo Soares Silva
 - Fânia Marielle Teixeira

References

External links 
Official Miss Brasil Website

2004
2004 in Brazil
2004 beauty pageants